The 2012 Ghana Movie Awards was the third edition of the ceremony to reward excellence in the Ghanaian Film Industry. The event was held at Accra International Conference Center on December 2, 2012. The nomination party took place on November 26, 2012.

Awards
 Best Actor in a Lead Role (English)
Van Vicker – Joni Waka
John Dumelo – Queen Latifa
Prince David Osei – Off The Hook
Kofi Adjorlolo – Wipe My Tears
Ekow Blankson – Secret Burden

 Best Actress in a Lead Role (English)
Yvonne Nelson – Single & Married
Martha Ankomah – Tears of a Smile
Jackie Appiah – Grooms Bride
Nana Akua Addo – Wanna Be
Yvonne Okoro – 3 Some
Nadia Buari – Rain

 Best Actor in a Lead Role (Local)
Akwesi Boadi – Osofo Mafia
Farida Mohammed – Gobana
Kofi Adu – Agya Koo Trotro Driver
Isaac Amoako – Saman Mogya
Kwaku Manu – Area Boys

 Best Actress in a Lead Role (Local)
Nana Ama Mcbrown – Nyankonton
Vivian Jill – My Story
Linda Abbey – Saman Mogya
Tracy Boakye – Oh Vera
Mercy Asiedu – Baby Face

 Best Actor in a Supporting Role (English)
Adjetey Anang – Rain
Majid Michel – Grooms Bride
Rahim Banda – Wipe My Tears
Edward Agyekum Kufuor – Tears Of A Smile
Frank Artus – The Game
Chris Attoh – Single & Married

 Best Actress in a Support Role (English)
Kalsum Sinare – 3 Some
Anita Erskine – Single & Married
Linda Awuku – Wanna Be
Lydia Forson – In The Cupboard
Christabel Ekeh – Wrong Target
Nikki Samonas – Queen Latifa

 Best Actor in a Support Role (Local)
Apostle John Prah – Osofo Mafia
Kwadwo Nkansah – Kweku Saman
Samuel Ofori – Oh Vera
Bernard Opoku – Police Officer
Ebenezer Donkoh – B14

 Best Actress in a Support Role (Local)
Naana Hayford – Odo Ntentan
Fatima Osman – Gobana
Rose Mensah – Fathia Fata Nkrumah
Emelia Brobbey – My Story
Matilda Asare – Ghana Police
Ellen White – Saman Mogya

 Best Actor (African Collaboration)
Kalu Ikeagwu – Shadow In The Dark
Ramsey Nouah – Hotel Babylon
Alex Usifo – Off The Hook
Uti Nwachukwu – In The Cupboard
Yemi Blaq – The Search
Alex Ekubo – Lovelorn

 Best Actress (African Collaboration)
Ini Edo – In The Cupboard
Patience Ozokwor – Untamed
Rukky Sanda – The Search
Nse Ikpe Etim –The Search
Tonto Dikeh – Lovelorn
Mercy Johnson – Wild Target

 Best Picture – African Collaboration
 Desmond Elliot & Caroline Danjuma – In The Cupboard
 Yvonne Nelson – Single & Married
 Abdul Sallam – Grooms Bride
 Andy Boyo – Untamed
 Kobi Rana – Hotel Babylon

 Best Picture
Joni Waka – Van Vicker & Dr. Clarice Kulah-Ford
 Grooms Bride – Abdul Sallam
 Single & Married – Yvonne Nelson Trap In The Game – Frank Rajah Arase
 Ghana Police – Eugene Morrat
 Hotel Babylon – Kobi Rana
 Secret Burden – Sellasie Ibrahim
 Wanna Be – Edmund Quarshie & Michael Odeka

 Best CinematographySingle & Married – Kwame AwuahHotel Babylon – Kobi Rana
Joni Waka – Van Vicker
Area Boys – Kwame Agyeman
Grooms Bride – Adams Umar

 Best Editing
 Grooms Bride – Enoch Opoku Hotel Babylon – Kobi Rana
 Single & Married – Ebenezer Sowatey
 B14 – Ninja
 Wanna Be – Afra Marley

 Best Costume and Wardrobe
 Queen Latifa – Mabel Germain
 Ghana Police – Monica Agboli & Nicolas Nsiah Return Of The Bukom Lion – De She Collections
 Fathia Fata Nkrumah – George Atobrah
 Grooms Bride – Samira Yakubu
 Secret Burden – Smarttys Management

 Best Art Direction
 Return Of The Bukom Lion
 Fathia Fata Nkrumah
 Rain
 Ghana Police
 Single & Married
 Secret Burden

 Best Music (Original Song)
Azonto Ghost – Bessa
Destiny’s Child – Wilhelmina Abu Andani (Mimi)
Single & Married – Abraham Affaine
Wrong Target – Samuel Sarpong
Fathia Fata Nkrumah – Adu Patrick

 Best Directing (English Language)
Single & Married – Pascal Amanfo
Grooms Bride – Frank Rajah Arase
Queen Latifah – Kensteve Anuka
In The Cupboard – Desmond Elliot
Hotel Babylon – Kobi Rana

References

Ghana Movie Awards
Ghana
2012 in Ghana